Ryan Murphy (born October 14, 1992) is a former American football strong safety. He played in college for the Oregon State Beavers, and was drafted by the Seattle Seahawks in the seventh round of the 2015 NFL Draft.

Professional career

Seattle Seahawks
On Saturday, May 2, 2015, Murphy was drafted by the Seattle Seahawks with the 248th pick in the seventh round of the 2015 NFL Draft. The Seahawks waived him on September 5 as part of final roster cuts.

Denver Broncos
The Denver Broncos signed Murphy to their practice squad on November 3, 2015.

On February 7, 2016, Murphy was part of the Broncos team that won Super Bowl 50. In the game, the Broncos defeated the Carolina Panthers by a score of 24–10.

On September 3, 2016, Murphy was waived by the Broncos. The next day he was signed to the Broncos' practice squad. He was released on September 22, 2016. He was re-signed to the practice squad on November 9, 2016. He was released by the Broncos on November 23, 2016.

New York Giants
On December 27, 2016, Murphy was signed to the Giants' practice squad. He signed a reserve/future contract with the Giants on January 9, 2017.

On September 2, 2017, Murphy was waived by the Giants and was signed to the practice squad the next day. He was promoted to the active roster on December 15, 2017.

On May 7, 2018, Murphy was waived by the Giants.

Arizona Hotshots
Murphy signed with the Arizona Hotshots of the Alliance of American Football in 2018, but was waived on January 8, 2019, before the start of the regular season.

References

External links
Seattle Seahawks bio
OSU Beavers bio

Living people
1992 births
American football safeties
Oregon State Beavers football players
Players of American football from Oakland, California
Seattle Seahawks players
Denver Broncos players
New York Giants players